Ileana Ianoșiu-Hangan (born 23 January 1969) is a Romanian biathlete. She competed at the 1992 Winter Olympics and the 1994 Winter Olympics. She also competed in cross-country skiing at the 1988 Winter Olympics and the 1992 Winter Olympics.

References

External links
 

1969 births
Living people
Biathletes at the 1992 Winter Olympics
Biathletes at the 1994 Winter Olympics
Cross-country skiers at the 1988 Winter Olympics
Cross-country skiers at the 1992 Winter Olympics
Romanian female biathletes
Romanian female cross-country skiers
Olympic biathletes of Romania
Olympic cross-country skiers of Romania
Place of birth missing (living people)
20th-century Romanian women